Several ships have been named Ajax for Ajax the Great, a figure from Greek mythology:

, of 655 tons (bm), was built by Perry, Blackwall. She sailed for the British East India Company until a French warship captured her in 1761. The French East India Company purchased her and she sailed for them until 1776.
 was launched at South Shields. She was condemned at Calcutta in 1822.
, of 303 tons (bm), was built by Hillhouse, Hill and Co., of Bristol. She was wrecked at Cindadella, Minorca, on 3 December 1862.
 - a screw steamer that provided logistical support to the Union Army during the Civil War, and commercial passenger and freight service on the Pacific Coast afterward.

Others
 – One of four steamships
 – One of eight vessels of the Royal Navy
 – One of four vessels of the United States Navy
 -  built by P. Schuijt jr at naval yard at Harlingen and broken up 1824
 – One of three ships of the French Navy

See also
 , a floating crane used to install the Panama Canal locks

 Ajax (disambiguation)

Ship names